Tennis events were contested at the 1985 Summer Universiade in Kobe, Japan.

Medal summary

Medal table

See also
 Tennis at the Summer Universiade

External links
World University Games Tennis on HickokSports.com

1985
Universiade
1985 Summer Universiade